Sasha was an alleged Soviet mole in the Central Intelligence Agency during the Cold War.

Manhunt 

In 1961, Anatoliy Golitsyn, a major in the KGB, was assigned to the embassy in Helsinki, Finland, under the name "Ivan Klimov." On 15 December, he defected to the US, along with his wife and daughter, by riding the train to the Swedish border. Golitsyn's defection so alarmed the KGB that orders were sent out to cancel all meetings with field agents out of fear that they would be identified.

Golitsyn was flown to the US and interviewed by David Murphy, the head of the CIA's Soviet Russia Division. After some time, Golitsyn began making increasing demands of the US and complaining about his treatment. Considering him to be unreliable, Murphy passed him on to James Jesus Angleton, the CIA's director of counterintelligence. Golitsyn's description of a traitor in the CIA, whom he knew only as "Sasha", led Angleton to embark on a multiyear manhunt that accused many members of the CIA of being the spy. The entire affair is still highly controversial.

Reparations 
Under United States Public Law 96-450,
passed in 1980 and commonly known as the "Mole Relief Act", C.I.A. employees who have been accused unfairly of disloyalty (e.g. Sasha) and who have had their careers subsequently ruined were allowed to receive government compensation.

List of accused CIA employees 
This is a partial list of CIA employees accused of being Sasha.  All were later cleared.

 Serge Karlow
 Richard Kovich 
 Alexander ″Sasha″ Sogolow

Others CIA employees, though not suspected to be ″Sasha″, were suspected to be moles in the course of the Sasha molehunt:
 Paul Garbler
 George Goldberg
 David Murphy
 Vasia C. Gmirkin

In popular culture 
 In Robert Littell's novel The Company, the alleged existence of Sasha is an important element of the plot.

Footnotes

See also 
 Aleksander Kopatzky

References 
 Martin, David C. Wilderness of Mirrors: Intrigue, Deception, and the Secrets that Destroyed Two of the Cold War's Most Important Agents. New York: The Lyons Press, 2003. .
 Wise, David. Molehunt: The Secret Search for Traitors That Shattered the CIA. New York: Random House, 1992. .

External links 
 "Of Moles and Molehunters" by Cleveland Cram, Center for the Study of Intelligence, October 1993.
 "C.I.A. Dug for Moles but Buried the Loyal" by David Johnston, The New York Times, March 8, 1992.

Cold War spies
Counterintelligence